C87 or C-87 may refer to :
 Consolidated C-87 Liberator Express
 Ruy Lopez, Closed, Averbach Variation chess openings ECO code
 Freedom of Association and Protection of the Right to Organise Convention, 1948 code
 Caldwell 87 (NGC 1261), a globular cluster in the constellation Horologium